The Photurinae are a subfamily of fireflies (Lampyridae). They contain many of the well-known North American species, such as the Pennsylvania firefly (Photuris pennsylvanica), state insect of Pennsylvania. They are among the "flashing" (as opposed to continuous-glow) fireflies known as "lightning bugs" in North America, although they are not too distantly related to the flashing fireflies in the Lampyrinae; as the most basal lineages of that subfamily do not produce light at all, the Photurinae's flashing signals seem to be convergent evolution.

The genus Photuris is often called "femme fatale fireflies", due to the females' habit of imitating other "lightning bugs'" flashes, to attract, kill, and eat them. Their prey includes such unrelated Lampyrinae like rover fireflies (Photinus) or Pyractomena.

Genera
 Bicellonycha Motschulsky, 1853
 Photuris Dejean, 1833 – femme fatale fireflies 
 Presbyolampis Buck, 1947
 Pyrogaster Motschulsky, 1853

References

Further reading

Lampyridae
Beetle subfamilies